Tanespimycin (17-N-allylamino-17-demethoxygeldanamycin, 17-AAG) is a derivative of the antibiotic geldanamycin that is being studied in the treatment of cancer, specifically in younger patients with certain types of leukemia or solid tumors, especially kidney tumors.

It works by inhibiting Hsp90, which is expressed in those tumors.

It belongs to the family of drugs called antitumor antibiotics.

Clinical trials

Bristol-Myers Squibb conducted Phase 1 and Phase 2 clinical trials.  However, in 2010 the company halted development of tanespimycin, during late-stage clinical trials as a potential treatment for multiple myeloma. While no definitive explanation was given, it has been suggested that Bristol-Myers Squibb halted development over concerns of the financial feasibility of tanespimycin development given the 2014 expiry of the patent on this compound, and the relative expense of manufacture.

References

External links
 National Cancer Institutie Bulletin on Phase 2 trials against Von Hippel-Lindau disease
 Safety sheet for 17AAG

Antibiotics
Experimental cancer drugs
1,4-Benzoquinones
Carbamates
Lactams
Ethers
Secondary alcohols
Ansamycins